Lewis B. Whitworth (July 5, 1923 – December 14, 2000) was an American judge and politician. He served as a Democratic member for the 94th district of the Florida House of Representatives.

Life and career 
Whitworth was born in Asheville, North Carolina. He attended North Carolina State University, the University of Maryland and George Washington University Law School.

In 1968, Whitworth was elected to represent the 94th district of the Florida House of Representatives, succeeding Kenneth M. Myers. He served until 1972, when he was succeeded by Jack Miller.

Whitworth was a Miami-Dade County circuit court judge.

Whitworth died in December 2000 of bone cancer, at the age of 77.

References 

1923 births
2000 deaths
Politicians from Asheville, North Carolina
Democratic Party members of the Florida House of Representatives
20th-century American politicians
Florida state court judges
20th-century American judges
North Carolina State University alumni
University of Maryland, College Park alumni
George Washington University Law School alumni
Deaths from bone cancer